Statistics of Japanese Regional Leagues in the 1971 season.

Champions list

By winning the All Japan Senior Football Championship and then defeating Nagoya Bank in a promotion/relegation Series, Towa ED was promoted to the Japan Soccer League; it and the remaining JSL clubs constituted the new JSL First Division, while Toyota, Kyoto and eight other clubs were chosen for the new JSL Second Division.

League standings

Kanto

Tokai

Kansai

1971
Jap
Jap
2